East Prairie is a city in Mississippi County, Missouri, United States. The population was 2,943 at the 2020 census.

History
A post office called East Prairie has been in operation since 1872. The community took its name from a prairie of the same near the original town site.  The current town, which lies about a mile south of the original post office site, was established in 1883 as a stop along the St. Louis Southwestern Railway ("Cotton Belt"), and was originally known as "Hibbard."  The East Prairie postmaster, S.P. Martin, moved the post office to the new town site. By 1900, the city's name had been changed from "Hibbard" to "East Prairie."

Hess Archeological Site, Hoecake Village Archeological Site, and Mueller Archeological Site, some of which contain Native American burial mounds, are located near East Prairie and are listed on the National Register of Historic Places.

Geography
As its name indicates, the city lies in the eastern portion of a lowland area that extends from the Ozark Plateau to the Mississippi River, covering much of the Bootheel.  Missouri Route 80 connects East Prairie with Interstate 55 and Matthews to the west, and the rural areas near the Mississippi River to the east. Route 105, which intersects Route 80 in East Prairie, connects the city with Charleston to the north. The small city of Anniston is located just northeast of East Prairie.

Demographics

2010 census
As of the census of 2010, there were 3,176 people, 1,294 households, and 846 families residing in the city. The racial makeup of the city was 95.69% White, 2.33% Black or African American, 0.38% Native American, 0.06% Asian, 0.38% from other races, and 1.16% from two or more races. Hispanic or Latino of any race were 1.42% of the population.

There were 1,294 households, of which 35.5% had children under the age of 18 living with them, 39.3% were married couples living together, 19.9% had a female householder with no husband present, 6.2% had a male householder with no wife present, and 34.6% were non-families. 29.7% of all households were made up of individuals, and 14.6% had someone living alone who was 65 years of age or older. The average household size was 2.42 and the average family size was 2.94.

The median age in the city was 38.5 years. 25.4% of residents were under the age of 18; 8.5% were between the ages of 18 and 24; 24.7% were from 25 to 44; 24.3% were from 45 to 64; and 17.2% were 65 years of age or older. The gender makeup of the city was 45.9% male and 54.1% female.

2000 census
As of the census of 2000, there were 3,227 people, 1,333 households, and 906 families residing in the city. The population density was 2,526.0 people per square mile (973.4/km2). There were 1,418 housing units at an average density of 1,110.0 per square mile (427.7/km2). The racial makeup of the city was 95.79% White, 2.26% African American, 0.65% Native American, 0.06% Asian, 0.28% from other races, and 0.96% from two or more races. Hispanic or Latino of any race were 0.77% of the population.

There were 1,333 households, out of which 32.8% had children under the age of 18 living with them, 45.7% were married couples living together, 18.8% had a female householder with no husband present, and 32.0% were non-families. 28.9% of all households were made up of individuals, and 15.2% had someone living alone who was 65 years of age or older. The average household size was 2.41 and the average family size was 2.95.

In the city the population was spread out, with 26.9% under the age of 18, 10.1% from 18 to 24, 26.6% from 25 to 44, 22.0% from 45 to 64, and 14.5% who were 65 years of age or older. The median age was 34 years. For every 100 females there were 84.3 males. For every 100 females age 18 and over, there were 78.5 males.

The median income for a household in the city was $19,825, and the median income for a family was $24,063. Males had a median income of $23,494 versus $16,284 for females. The per capita income for the city was $10,912. About 25.6% of families and 30.1% of the population were below the poverty line, including 33.0% of those under age 18 and 32.4% of those age 65 or over.

Education
East Prairie R-II School District operates one elementary school, one middle school and East Prairie High School.

East Prairie has a public library, a branch of the Mississippi County Library District.

Arts and culture
East Prairie is the host of the Tour de Corn bicycle ride each summer during the town's Sweetcorn Festival that attracts cyclists from many surrounding states and raises money for local charities.

In the media
Significant portions of the 1961 film The Intruder (directed by Roger Corman and starring William Shatner) were filmed in East Prairie.

Notable people

Orlin Collier, who briefly pitched with the Detroit Tigers in 1931, was born in East Prairie in 1907.
Dan Smoot, figure in the anti-communist movement, born in East Prairie in 1913.

References

External links

 Historic maps of East Prairie in the Sanborn Maps of Missouri Collection at the University of Missouri

Cities in Mississippi County, Missouri
Populated places established in 1881
1881 establishments in Missouri
Cities in Missouri